Kim Dovey  is an Australian architectural and urban critic and Professor of Architecture and Urban Design at the University of Melbourne, Australia, teaching and researching urban design. 
Born in Western Australia he received degrees from Curtin University and the University of Melbourne, and a Ph.D. from the University of California, Berkeley, USA. He has lectured and broadcast widely on social issues in architecture and urban design. His book Framing Places (2nd ed. 2008) explores theories of place as mediators of power, incorporating case studies of politics of public space, housing, shopping malls and corporate towers. Becoming Places (2010) explores the formation of place identity and develops a theory of place as dynamic assemblage. Urban Design Thinking (2016) is a broad-ranging application of assemblage thinking in urban design.  Mapping Urbanities (2017) demonstrates applied research using urban mapping in the production of spatial knowledge. He has made significant contributions to theories of place, transit-oriented development, urban density, walkability, informal settlement and creative clusters. He is author of the Urban DMA theory of walkability. He is Co-Director of InfUr- the Informal Urbanism Research Hub at the University of Melbourne where he leads research on  informal settlement and street vending. 

In November 2022 he was elected a Fellow of the Academy of the Social Sciences in Australia.

References 

 A is for Architecture podcast - March 2023.  https://www.aisforarchitecture.org/
   website
 https://infur.msd.unimelb.edu.au/

Selected publications

Books 

 Dovey, K (2005) Fluid City: Transforming Melbourne's Urban Waterfront, London: Routledge ( (pbk.))
 Dovey, K (2008) Framing Places: Mediating Power in Built Form, 2nd ed, London: Routledge ( (pbk))
 Dovey, K (2010) Becoming Places: Urbanism / Architecture / Identity / Power, London: Routledge ( (pbk.))
 Dovey, K. (2016) Urban Design Thinking: A Conceptual Toolkit, London, Bloomsbury
 Dovey, K. Pafka, E. & Ristic, M. (eds) Mapping Urbanities: Morphologies, Flows, Possibilities, New York: Routledge
 Dovey, K., Adams, R. & Jones, R. (2018) Urban Choreography, Melbourne: Melbourne University Press (ISBN: 9780522871661)
 Dovey, K, van Oostrum, M., Shafique, T., Chatterjee, I. & Pafka, E. (2023) Atlas of Informal Settlement: Understanding self-organized urban design, London: Bloomsbury. (ISBN:	9781350295063)

Book chapters 
 Dovey, K. (2020) ‘Place as Assemblage’, in: T. Edensor, Kothari, U. & Kaladides, A. (eds) The Routledge Handbook of Place, London: Routledge, pp. 21–31.
 Dovey, K. & Pafka, E. (2020) ‘Mapping the Publicness of Public Space’, in Mehta, V. and  Palazzo, D. (eds) Companion to Public Space, New York: Routledge, pp. 234–48.
 Dovey, K. (2019) ‘Informal Settlement as a Mode of Production’, in: Bannerjee, T. & Loukaitou-Sideris, A. (eds) The New Companion to Urban Design, New York: Routledge, pp. 139–51.
 Dovey, K. (2017) 'Informal Settlement and Assemblage Theory' in: Hannigan, J. & Richards, G. (eds) The Handbook of New Urban Studies, London: Sage, pp. 480–95.
 Dovey, K. (2016) 'Place as Multiplicity' in: Freestone, R. & Lui, R. (eds) Place and Placelessness Revisited, London: Routledge, pp. 257–268.
 Dovey, K. (2013) ‘Informalizing Architecture: The Challenge of Informal Settlements’, in Mosley, J. & Sara, R. (eds) Architecture of Transgression, London: AD Monographs, pp. 82–89.
 Dovey, K. (2013) ‘Assembling Architecture’, in Frichot, H. & Loo, S. (eds) Deleuze and Architecture, Edinburgh: University of Edinburgh Press. pp. 131–148.
 Dovey, K. (2013) ‘Planning and Place Identity’ in: Young, G. et al. (eds) The Ashgate Research Companion to Planning and Culture, London: Ashgate, pp. 257–271.
 Dovey, K. (2014) ‘Incremental Urbanism; The Emergence of Informal Settlements’, in Haas, T. & Olsson, K. (eds), Emergent Urbanism, London: Ashgate, pp. 45–54.
 Dovey, K. (2007) "I Mean to be Critical But..." in: Rendell, J. et al. (eds) "Critical Architecture", London: Routledge, pp. 252–60.
 Dovey, K. & Polakit, K.  (2006) "Urban Slippage: Smooth and Striated Streetscapes in Bangkok", in: Franck, K. & Stevens, Q. (eds) "Loose Space", London: Routledge, pp. 168–193.
 Dovey, K (2005) "Home as Paradox" in: G. Rowles, & H. Chuadhury (eds) Home and Identity in Late Life, New York: Springer, pp. 361–70.
 Dovey, K (2002) "The Silent Complicity of Architecture". In J. Hillier & E.V. Rooksby (eds), Habitus: A sense of place. Aldershot: Ashgate, pp. 267–280.

Refereed Journals 
 Dovey, K., Recio, R. & Pafka, E. (2022) 'The Spatial Logic of Informal Street Vending in Manila', Space and Polity. (doi.org/10.1080/13562576.2022.2153224)
 Dovey, K. & Recio, R.B. (2023) 'Harnessing Settlement Re-Informalization', Habitat International. 131, 102724. (doi.org/10.1016/j.habitatint.2022.102724.)
 Dovey, K., van Oostrum, M., Chatterjee, I. & Shafique, T. (2020) ' Towards A Morphogenesis of Informal Settlement', Habitat International. 104, 1-14. 
 Dovey, K., Shafique, T., van Oostrum, M. & Chatterjee, I. (2021)  'Informal Settlement is Not a Euphemism for 'Slum', International Development Planning Review. 43(2), 139–150. (doi.org/10.3828/idpr.2020.14)
 Kamalipour, H. & Dovey, K. (2020) 'Incremental Production of Urban Space: A typology of informal design', Habitat International. advance online Publ:  
 Dovey, K., Cook, B. & Achmadi, A. (2019) 'Contested Riverscapes in Jakarta: Flooding, forced eviction and urban image', Space and Polity. 
 Kamalipour, H. & Dovey, K. (2019) ‘Mapping the Visibility of Informal Settlements’, Habitat International, 85, 63–75. 
 Dovey, K. & Pafka, E. (2020) ‘What is Walkability?: The Urban DMA’, Urban Studies, 57(1), 93–108. 
 Pafka, E., Dovey, K. & Aschwanden, G. (2018) ‘Limits of Space Syntax for Urban Design’ Environment & Planning B. 47(3) 508–522. 
 Rau, F. Dovey, K. & Pafka, E. (2018) 'Towards a Genealogy of Urban Shopping', Journal of Urban Design. 23 (4):  544–57. 
 Dovey, K., Woodcock, I. & Pike, L. (2017) 'Isochrone Mapping of Urban Transport', Planning Practice & Research, Advance online publication:  
 Dovey, K. Rao, F. & Pafka, E. (2017) 'Agglomeration and Assemblage', Urban Studies, Advance online publication: . 
 Dovey, K. & Pafka, E. (2017) 'What is Functional Mix?', Planning Theory & Practice, 18 (2): 249–267 
 Dovey, K.  Pike, L. & Woodcock, I. (2017) 'Incremental Urban Intensification', Urban Policy and Research, 35 (3): 261–274. 
 Pafka, E. & Dovey, K. (2017) ‘Permeability and Interface Catchment: Measuring and Mapping Walkability’, Journal of Urbanism, 10(2): 150–162, 
 Dovey, K. & Ristic, M. (2015) 'Mapping Urban Assemblages: The Production of Spatial Knowledge', Journal of Urbanism. 
 Dovey, K. & Pafka, E. (2015) 'The Science of Urban Design?' Urban Design International, 
 Wood, S. & Dovey, K. (2015) ‘Creative Multiplicities: The Morphology of Creative Clustering’ Journal of Urban Design, 20 (1), 52–74. 
 Dovey, K. & Wood, S. (2015) ‘Public/Private Urban Interfaces: Type, Adaptation, Assemblage’ Journal of Urbanism, 8 (1) 1–16.
 Dovey, K. & Fisher, K. (2014) ‘Designing for Adaptation: The School as Socio-Spatial Assemblage’, Journal of Architecture, 19 (10) 43–63.
 Dovey, K. & Pafka, E. (2014) ‘The Urban Density Assemblage’, Urban Design International. 19 (1) 66–76.
 Dovey, K. (2012) ‘Informal Settlement and Complex Adaptive Assemblage’, International Development Planning Review, 34 (3) 371–90.
 Dovey, K. & King, R. (2012) ‘Informal Urbanism and the Taste for Slums’, Tourism Geographies, 14 (2) 275–93.
 Dovey, K., Wollan, S. & Woodcock, I. (2012) ‘Placing Graffiti’ Journal of Urban Design, 17 (1): 21–41.
 Dovey, K. (2011) ‘Uprooting Critical Urbanism’, City, 15 (3/4), 347–54.
 Dovey, K., Woodcock, I. & Wood, S. ‘A Test of Character’ Urban Studies, 46 (1/2) 1–21.
 Dovey K. & Sandercock L. (2002) "Hype and hope: Imagining Melbourne's Docklands". City. 6(1), 83–101. 
 Sandercock L. & Dovey K.G. (2002) "Pleasure, politics and the 'public interest': Melbourne's riverscape revitalization". Journal of the American Planning Association. 68(2), 2002:151–164. 
 Dovey K., Fitzgerald J.L. & Choi Y. (2001) "Safety Becomes Danger: Dilemmas of drug-use in public space". Health and Place, 7, 319–331. 
 Dovey, K. (2000)  "Redistributing Danger: Enclosure and Encounter in Urban Design", Australian Planner 37(1), 10–13
 Dovey, K. (2000) "Myth and Media: Constructing Aboriginal Architecture", Journal of Architectural Education 54(1), 2–6

External links
Homepage at the University of Melbourne
Personal Website: http://www.placeresearch.net/

Urban theorists
Dovey, Kim
Academic staff of the University of Melbourne
Dovey, Kim
Fellows of the Academy of the Social Sciences in Australia
Australian non-fiction writers
Living people
Year of birth missing (living people)